Soomro (or Soomra, Sumrah) is a Sindhi tribe mainly based in Sindh, parts of Punjab bordering Sindh and in Balochistan, Pakistan.

Soomro may also refer to: 
Soomra dynasty, rulers in the Sindh region of present-day Pakistan from 1025 to 1351
Tando Soomro, a village and union council of Tando Allahyar District, Sindh province, Pakistan

People with the surname
Abdul Karim Soomro, Pakistani politician, Member of the Provincial Assembly of Sindh
Abdul Wahid Soomro, Pakistani politician, Member of the National Assembly of Pakistan
Adal Soomro (born 1955), Sindhi language poet and academician
Ahmed Mian Soomro, Pakistani politician
Allah Bux Soomro (1900–1943), a zamindar, government contractor, Indian independence activist and politician from the province of Sindh in British India
Ayaz Soomro (1958–2018), Pakistani politician and lawyer, member of the National Assembly of Pakistan
Dodo Bin Khafef Soomro III, ruler of Sindh
Zainab Tari, ruled as queen of Sindh from 1092 AD until 1102 AD.
Elahi Bux Soomro, Pakistani politician and legislator
Fozia Soomro (1966–2002), Sindhi folk singer
Kainat Soomro (born 1993), Pakistani woman activist whose struggle to obtain justice for her gang rape at the age of 13 drew international attention
Khalid Mehmood Soomro (1959–2014), a religious leader of Pakistan
Muhammad Mian Soomro (born 1950), Pakistani politician and a banker
Rahim Bux Soomro (1913–2005), a politician in Sindh, Pakistan